Stand by the Power is the 28th studio album by Christian music vocal group The Imperials, released in 1982 on DaySpring Records. This is the first album to feature new lead singer Paul Smith, who replaced Russ Taff after being with the group since 1976. While promoting an Imperials concert at Baylor University where he was a student, Smith gave Armond Morales a tape of his music. When Morales learned that Taff was leaving, he called Smith. Smith co-wrote five songs on this album and the Imperials also covered the Kerry Livgren track "How Can You Live" from his album Seeds of Change (1980). In 1983, the Imperials won the Dove Award for Group of the Year at the 14th GMA Dove Awards.The album peaked at number two on the Billboard Top Inspirational Albums chart.

Track listing

Personnel 

The Imperials
 Paul Smith – lead vocals
 Jim Murray – tenor, vocals
 David Will – baritone, vocals
 Armond Morales – bass, vocals

Musicians
 James Newton Howard – pianos, synthesizers, string arrangements 
 Hadley Hockensmith – guitars
 Dann Huff – guitars 
 Steve Lukather – guitars 
 Carlos Rios – guitars
 Nathan East – bass 
 Neil Stubenhaus – bass 
 Jeff Porcaro – drums 
 Carlos Vega – drums 
 Lenny Castro – percussion 
 Bob Wilson – horn arrangements (9)

Production
 Bill Schnee – producer, engineer 
 David Schober – assistant engineer 
 Scott Hendricks – assistant vocal engineer 
 Skip Moon – assistant vocal engineer 
 Susan Pyron – production coordinator 
 Michael Borum – front cover photography 
 Allan Messer – back cover photography

Charts

Radio singles

Accolades
GMA Dove Awards

1983 Group of the Year

References

1982 albums
The Imperials albums
Word Records albums